Agrilactobacillus yilanensis is a Gram-positive bacterium from the genus of Agrilactobacillus.

References

Lactobacillaceae
Bacteria described in 2019